The following is a list of the 21 largest civil settlements, reached between the United States Department of Justice and pharmaceutical companies from 2001 to 2017, ordered by the size of the total civil settlement. Some of these matters also resolved criminal fines and penalties, listed in parentheses, but these amounts are not considered when ranking these settlements as some of the settlements listed did not have a criminal component. Thus, this article provides the most accurate list of the largest civil-only portion of settlements between pharmaceutical companies and the Department of Justice. Because this article focuses on civil portions of settlements, some of the larger total settlements do not make the list.  For example, Purdue Pharmaceuticals entered an agreement with the United States, pleading guilty to felony misbranding of OxyContin with intent to defraud and mislead under sections 33 1(a) and 333(a)(2) of the FD&C Act and agreed to pay more than $600 million, but only $160 million was allocated to resolve civil claims under the False Claims Act, while the remainder was allocated to resolve criminal claims and private claims.

Legal claims against the pharmaceutical industry have varied widely over the past two decades, including Medicare and Medicaid fraud driven by off-label promotion, and inadequate manufacturing practices. With respect to off-label promotion, specifically, a federal court recognized that bills submitted to Medicare or Medicaid driven by off-label promotion as a violation of the False Claims Act for the first time in Franklin v. Parke-Davis, leading to a $430 million settlement. The civil portion of this settlement was $190 million, and it is the last settlement included in the below table.

See also
Pharmaceutical fraud
List of off-label promotion pharmaceutical settlements

References 

Lists of lawsuits
Pharmaceutical industry in the United States
Product liability
Medical controversies
Drug advertising